Santa Eulalia de la Peña is a village under the local government of the municipality of Nueno, Hoya de Huesca, Huesca, Aragon, Spain.

Populated places in the Province of Huesca